If Not Now Then When is a compilation album containing material from the new wave band, The Motels, plus solo work by Martha Davis. This two disc album is a collection of twenty-seven rare tracks, demos, and recent recordings spanning 2002 to 2006, and outtakes from Davis' solo albums ...So the Story Goes and Beautiful Life. Fifteen of the tracks are previously unreleased.

Track listing

References 

2017 compilation albums
The Motels albums